Lemonniera is a genus of fungi belonging to the family Discinellaceae.

The genus has almost cosmopolitan distribution.

The genus name of Lemonniera is in honour of Georges Le Monnier (1843–1931), who was a French scientist.

The genus was circumscribed by Émile Auguste Joseph De Wildeman in Ann. Soc. Belge Microscop. vol.18 on page 147 in 1894.

Species:
Lemonniera alabamensis 
Lemonniera aquatica 
Lemonniera centrosphaera 
Lemonniera cornuta 
Lemonniera filiformis 
Lemonniera filiformis 
Lemonniera pseudofloscula 
Lemonniera terrestris 
Lemonniera yulongensis

References

Helotiales
Helotiales genera